John Henry Ryan II (born August 19, 1987), also known as John the Blind and JRY, is an American singer, songwriter, record producer, and multi-instrumentalist from Rochester, New York. Ryan is best known for co-writing and co-producing One Direction's last four albums and many of their singles. He has written songs for many acclaimed artists. His compositions and productions have sold over 30 million units worldwide.

Early life
John Henry Ryan II is from Pittsford, New York, United States. He grew up the youngest in his family with his mother, older brother Joe, and older sister Julie. Ryan wrote his first song in third grade, learning to play guitar and piano at a young age. He continued to write throughout his childhood, even making an album in eighth grade that he was selling out of his locker. By the time he was 16 or 17, he remembers having to choose between music and sports and states that “music came the most naturally and made [him] the happiest.” He sent his only college application to Berklee College of Music in Boston, Massachusetts. During his time at Berklee, Ryan learned music theory, fronted two bands, and continued to write his own material. He also spent the latter half of his college years learning to produce pop, hip hop, and alternative music. Ryan was lead guitarist for classmate Isom Innis' project, Southern Belle.

During his junior year, Ryan visited a few friends in Los Angeles, and met Damon Bunetta, who later became his manager, at a party. They exchanged numbers, ideas, and kept in contact. At the time, Damon, his brother Julian Bunetta, and their father Peter Bunetta were expanding their company, Family Affair Productions, and were looking to add another producer/artist/writer to the team. After graduating from Berklee in 2010, Ryan moved to Los Angeles to begin his career as an artist and producer.

Career
Ryan had many friends (including Julian Bunetta) who were working on the American version of The X Factor in 2011. Hit songwriter, Savan Kotecha, was involved in the television program at the time, and worked on One Direction’s first two records. After hearing Kotecha rave about an emerging act discovered on UK’s X Factor and explaining that there was a break in the market for boy bands, Ryan and Bunetta got onboard. Ryan’s first big cut was "Story of My Life" with One Direction, reaching the Top 10 on the Billboard charts.

Influenced By Booker T. & the M.G's, Elvis Presley, Elvis Costello, Radiohead, The Beatles, MGMT & Julian Casablancas. Ryan has co-written and/or produced multiple songs by artists including One Direction, John Legend, David Guetta, Thomas Rhett, Harry Styles, Maroon 5, Niall Horan, Pitbull, Jason Derulo, Charlie Puth, Rudimental, Fifth Harmony, Cody Simpson, Nick Jonas, and Emblem3 among others. In total, he has 27 tracks which have been released on four of One Direction's albums (Take Me Home, Midnight Memories, Four, and Made in the A.M.). Ryan co-wrote and co-produced the songs "Midnight Memories" and "Steal My Girl."

In addition to writing and producing for pop artists, Ryan formed his solo project John the Blind. The moniker references ancient Bohemian king John of Bohemia who fought his wars blind and was carted onto the field of battle on horseback by his men.

Ryan was a featured vocalist on Pitbull's "Fireball," and appeared in the music video. He was also a featured vocalist on Brass Knuckles' "As Long As I'm Alive" and "Water Gun", as well as DJ Snake's "Sober" (as JRY). As JRY, Ryan has additionally released the singles "Pray" featuring Rooty, and "FWY" (with audacy).

Discography

Singles
Featured in

Production discography

References

1987 births
Living people
American male singer-songwriters
Singer-songwriters from New York (state)
Record producers from New York (state)
Berklee College of Music alumni
21st-century American singers
21st-century American male singers